The 2013 Sacred Heart Pioneers football team represented Sacred Heart University in the 2013 NCAA Division I FCS football season. They were led by head coach Mark Nofri in his first official year as head coach after serving as the interim head coach in 2012. They played their home games at Campus Field. They were a member of the Northeast Conference. The Pioneers finished the season 10–3, 4–2 in NEC play to share the NEC championship with Duquesne. Due to their win over Dequesne, they earned the conference's automatic bid to the FCS Playoffs, their first ever playoff appearance, where they were defeated in the first round by Fordham.

Schedule

Source: Schedule

References

Sacred Heart
Sacred Heart Pioneers football seasons
Northeast Conference football champion seasons
Sacred Heart
Sacred Heart Pioneers football